The 1961 Ballon d'Or, given to the best football player in Europe as judged by a panel of sports journalists from UEFA member countries, was awarded to Omar Sívori on 12 December 1961.

Rankings

Notes

References

External links
 France Football Official Ballon d'Or page

1961
1960–61 in European football